Odious Mortem is an American death metal band from San Francisco/Santa Cruz, California, United States. The band is currently signed to Willowtip Records. Odious Mortem has released three studio albums, through Unique Leader Records and Willowtip Records, as well as an independently released demo in 2003.

Style
Odious Mortem's musical style features technically complex, down-tuned guitars and relentless pummeling drum work. Lyrical themes include humanity, the Earth, drugs, psychosis, greed, fear, suffering, society, annihilation, human consciousness, and the collapse of civilization.

Biography
Odious Mortem was formed in 2000 in Encinitas, California by KC Howard (drums), David Siskin (guitar), and Dan Eggers (guitar, vocals). In 2003, Odious Mortem recorded and independently released a demo, Gestation of Worms, which led to a deal with Unique Leader Records. The band recorded their debut album, Devouring The Prophecy, with engineer Matt Sotelo of Decrepit Birth, in March 2004 at Legion Studios in Santa Cruz, CA. It was released on February 8, 2005.

In 2004, KC Howard joined death metal band Decrepit Birth as a full-time member. In November 2006, after their "Bloodletting North America" tour with Deeds of Flesh, Odious Mortem completed work on their second album and headed into Castle Ultimate Studios in Oakland, California to record new material. The resulting album, Cryptic Implosion, was released on April 24, 2007. Also in 2007, the band played at the Maryland Deathfest.

Other projects
Dan Eggers, Joel Horner, and KC Howard were members of Decrepit Birth until 2010, and Anthony Trapani recently joined the death metal outfit Severed Savior. David Siskin is playing jungle and drum & bass music under the alias Warbreaker.

Discography

Albums

Members

Current members 
Anthony Trapani - Vocals
Dan Eggers - Rhythm Guitars
Joel Horner - Bass
KC Howard - Drums
Alex Bacey - Lead Guitars
Cary Geare - Melodic Guitars

Past members 
Ivan Munguia - Bass
David Siskin - Guitars
Lee Smith - Drums

References

External links
Official Site
Odious Mortem music, videos, stats, and photos
Cryptic Implosion at Willowtip Records

Death metal musical groups from California
Musicians from Santa Cruz, California
Musical quintets